Upton is a village and civil parish north of Skilgate in Somerset, England. It is situated on a hill above the eastern end of Wimbleball Lake.

History
The parish of Upton was part of the Williton and Freemanners Hundred.

Pepperpot Castle, which is also known as Haddon Lodge, was built By Lady Harriet Acland, during the long period of her widowhood, 1778–1815, as a lodge to the drive to connect Pixton Park in Dulverton where her daughter the Countess of Carnarvon lived, with her own estates near Wiveliscombe.

Governance
The parish council has responsibility for local issues, including setting an annual precept (local rate) to cover the council’s operating costs and producing annual accounts for public scrutiny. The parish council evaluates local planning applications and works with the local police, district council officers, and neighbourhood watch groups on matters of crime, security, and traffic. The parish council's role also includes initiating projects for the maintenance and repair of parish facilities, as well as consulting with the district council on the maintenance, repair, and improvement of highways, drainage, footpaths, public transport, and street cleaning. Conservation matters (including trees and listed buildings) and environmental issues are also the responsibility of the council.

The village falls within the non-metropolitan district of Somerset West and Taunton, which was established on 1 April 2019. It was previously in the district of West Somerset, which was formed on 1 April 1974 under the Local Government Act 1972, and part of Dulverton Rural District before that. The district council is responsible for local planning and building control, local roads, council housing, environmental health, markets and fairs, refuse collection and recycling, cemeteries and crematoria, leisure services, parks, and tourism.

Somerset County Council is responsible for running the largest and most expensive local services such as education, social services, libraries, main roads, public transport, policing and  fire services, trading standards, waste disposal and strategic planning.

It is also part of the Bridgwater and West Somerset county constituency represented in the House of Commons of the Parliament of the United Kingdom. It elects one Member of Parliament (MP) by the first past the post system of election.

Religious sites
The remains of the Old Church of St James, which dates from the 14th century can still be seen. The current parish church of St James was built in 1870.

The non conformist Ebenezer Chapel dates from 1878.

References

External links

Villages in West Somerset
Civil parishes in Somerset